Maduve Aagona Baa is 2001 Kannada-language film starring Shivarajkumar, Laya, and Shilpi. It was a remake of Telugu film Pellichesukundam  (1998)

Plot
The film is about a rape victim sheltered by a kind hearted businessman who happens to be her former boss.

Cast

Shiva Rajkumar
Laya
Shilpi
Sumithra
Srilalitha
Vanishree
Sundar Raj
Rekha Das
Sanketh Kashi
Rajitha Choudary
Sadhu Kokila
Meghana
Mandya Ramesh
Devishree 
Sharan
Radha Prashanthi
Raman Panjabi
Arasikere Raju
Shivaram
Ramya
Devan
Amoolya
Mohanraj
Baby Nandini
Venkatesh Prasad
Master Vijay
Ramakrishna

Soundtrack
The music was composed by Koti-Srilekha and released by Akash Audio. All lyrics were penned by K. Kalyan.

References

External links
 

Kannada remakes of Telugu films
2001 films
Indian drama films
2000s Kannada-language films
Films about rape in India
Films scored by Koti
Films scored by M. M. Srilekha
Suresh Productions films